The Achingmori incident refers to an event in the year 1953 when a group of Daphla tribals of the Tagin people killed 47 members of an Indian government party including personnel of the Assam Rifles and tribal porters during an administrative tour in Achingmori in present-day Arunachal Pradesh. Apart from tribal rivalries and unfollowed security protocols, the massacre was also attributed to a rumour that the government party was there to free slaves. A village priest had also confirmed this through an omen. The tribal leaders who were guilty were jailed for three to four years. This was considered as too short a period by the Galong tribals who were also victims in the massacre. They in turn killed one of the leaders behind the massacre.

Background 

The area in which the incident happened, as well as nearby areas, were completely un-administered at the time. There were no roads or communication, and the tribals of the area were also unfamiliar with not only Indian administration, but any type of external administration. The Daflas were some of the most primitive of the tribes restricted to a certain area in the Daphla Hills, unaware of modern administration. In 1953 Nehru stated in the parliament that "The fact that that place is not an administered area does not mean that it is outside — I am not talking about law, but of practice — the territory of the Indian Union. As a matter of fact, we are administering area beyond it, the border area that is administered. We have outposts and checkposts beyond that. These are virgin forests in between and the question does not arise of their considering in a constitutional sense what their position is. I do not think they are acquainted with any Constitution."

At the time, the Indian government was also following a policy of restraint when establishing administration throughout NEFA (now called Arunachal Pradesh). In 1951, India, represented by an Assistant Political Officer, Ralengnao Khathing, took control of Tawang with just one platoon (36 soldiers), of the Assam Rifles, a paramilitary force.

Incident 
On 22 October 1953, Patrol Commander Major R.D. Singh, accompanied by 22 personnel of the Assam Rifles, one Area Superintendent, two Jamadars, two interpreters, 17 village headmen and 100 porters, arrived at Achingmori. The purpose of the group was to investigate tribal feuds, other than its humanitarian role.

The group set up camp at a clearing surrounded by thick forest as suggested by the locals. The location had temporary huts, and Major Singh considered this as a sign of friendliness, resulting in lax protective measures. Sometime later 10 Daflas asked for permission to enter the camp. The sentry did not disarm them and as soon as they entered the camp following permission from Major Singh, the sentry was killed. Following this, 400 to 500 Daflas, armed with primitive weapons, launched an attack. A total of 47 members of the group, including the Major, were killed while the remaining were taken captive.

Nari Rustomji writes:

Aftermath 
Major Singh was blamed for failing to take normal precautions. Two previous administrative parties had met with no such incident. The massacre also supposedly happened because of the tribal rivalries and history between the Daflas and Arbors. There were a number of Arbor porters in the group. The cause of the incident was also attributed to a rumour related to the government party and their goal of freeing slaves. During the incident one of the tribal porters, Tare Nosi, managed to escape despite a sword wound. He managed to travel 70 miles towards Along.

Information about the attack reached Gusar Outpost on 25 October. A small rescue party was sent however due to the destruction of a bridge by the Daflas, the rescue party could not reach the location. When the information reached Shillong, various outposts in Subansiri and the Abor Hills were reinforced with Assam Rifles platoons flown in by the Indian Air Force. The air force was also involved in extensive "reconnoitre". Assam Rifles sent some battalions to find those responsible for the massacre but were unsuccessful. Tagin tribes have very little permanent dwellings and can keep up evasion tactics over a long period.

On 21 November 1953, Nehru said in the parliament,

In 1955, a former army officer and Indian Frontier Administrative Service officer P. N. Kaul was given the responsibility to arrest those responsible. The only people who were willing to point Kaul in the direction of the culprits were those who had lost people in the incident. The main culprits were Agi Radap of the Radap sub-clan of Tagins. Following information regarding his location, Kaul went to his village. Following a few days of talks with Radap as well as Duchak Kora and Komda Kotuk, Agi Radap came before Kaul alone and told him how the massace was planned. A rumour had spread among them that the government team was coming to free slaves in the area. On top of this, the village priest said that an omen had favoured murdering the government party. Soon after, Kaul managed to arrest and try the leaders of the massacre. Even though they were given life imprisonment, they were released in three or four years.

This short imprisonment did not go down well with the Galongs, the ones who had lost people in the massacre. A few months later Komda Kotuk was dragged through Yomcha village and tortured in the same way as the Achingmori victims had been tortured. The aggrieved tribals had been planning this since the day of the massacre and had been keeping a track on Komda for over a year. Kaul knew that punishing the tribals under the Indian Penal Code would not be considered as justice in their eyes. Kaul would go on to write,

A large part of the restraint shown by India following this incident goes to Nari Rustomji, an advisor of the governor of Assam J D Daulatram. In place of an aggressive military reaction, Nari Rustomji got the guilty convicted after a procedurally sound trial. However, Ajai Shukla writes that the lack of Indian military in the area caused its own problems; "placing local sensibilities above national security also created the mindset that led to the 1962 defeat."

References 
Citations

Bibliography

Further reading 

 APCC mourns death of freedom fighter. Arunachal Observer. 23 February 2018 "He was awarded certificate of merit by NEFA administration for his meritorious and exemplary services rendered during 1953 Achingmori incident."

History of Arunachal Pradesh